Dennis R. Burton (born 1952) is a professor of immunology and microbiology at the Scripps Research Institute in La Jolla, California, in the United States. He also works in AIDS vaccine research, and is scientific director of the IAVI Neutralizing Antibody Center there. He sits on the steering committee of the Ragon Institute of Massachusetts General Hospital, MIT and Harvard.

He has a BA in chemistry from the University of Oxford, and a PhD in nuclear magnetic resonance in biology from Lund University in Lund, Sweden.

Awards

 Jenner Fellowship of the Lister Institute
 Fellowship in the American Academy of Microbiology
 James and Jessie Minor Chair in Immunology
 NIH Merit Award

Academic and Professional Experience 

 2015-2017 Chairman, Immunology and Microbial Science (IMS) Scripps Research
 1991-2017 Professor, Immunology and Microbial Science (IMS) Scripps Research
 2015-2015 Distinguished Lecturer, The American Association of Immunologists
 2012 Professor (Joint Appointment), Molecular Biology, Scripps Research
 1990-1991 Personal Chair, The University of Sheffield
 1989-1991 Visiting Member, Research Institute of Scripps Clinic
 1985-1991 Jenner Fellow, Lister Institute of Preventive Medicine
 1987-1990 Senior Lecturer in Biochemistry, The University of Sheffield
 1981-1987 Lecturer in Biochemistry, The University of Sheffield
 1980-1981 Junior Research Fellow, Wolfson College, University of Oxford
 1979-1981 Medical Research Council Training Fellowship, University of Oxford

Personal life
Burton plays football twice a week.

Reference 

1952 births
Living people
HIV/AIDS researchers
Academics of the University of Sheffield
Scripps Research faculty
Lund University alumni
Alumni of the University of Oxford
British immunologists
American immunologists
Fellows of the American Academy of Microbiology